This is a list of sports stadiums in Tanzania, ranked in descending order of capacity.

List

See also
 List of African stadiums by capacity

References

 
Tanzania
Stadiums